Phiyada Akkaraseranee (Thai: พิยดา อัครเศรณี), later Phiyada Jutharattanakul (Thai: พิยดา จุฑารัตนกุล), nickname Aom, (born June 17, 1975), is a Thai actress, model, and host.

Life
Phiyada Akkraseranee was born in Bangkok, where she graduated with a Bachelor of Science degree in education from the Srinakharinwirot University. She began her career as a model for commercials on TV in 1996. Her first drama as the leading actress was Torfun and Marwin produced by Exact co. Since then Aom has filmed many popular dramas such as "Torfun Gub Marwin" "Keb Pandin" "Ruk Kerd Nai Thaladsod" "Roy Leh Saneh Rai" "Mueng Dala" "Lued Kattiya" "Song Rao Nirundorn" "Huajai Chocolate" "Ruk Tur Took Wun" "BangRuk Soi 9" "Malai Sarm Chai"and so on. Aom gained a lot of popular and talent Awards including Best actress of Asian Television Awards. Meanwhile, Aom also became a hot host of variety talk shows for Wan Warn Yang Wharn You and E-mouth since 2004.

Aom engaged to her boyfriend Art Sara Jutharattanakul on July 4, 2009.
They were married in August 2009, and their wedding reception was held in October 2009.
They have a daughter named Nava.

Filmography

Films
 The Remaker (คนระลึกชาติ)（2005） with Andrew Gregson

TV dramas
 Torfun Gub Marwin (ทอฝันกับมาวิน) (CH5,1996) with Fluke Kerkpol
 Samwai Gub Aijoke (ทรามวัยกับไอ้จก) (CH5,1997)  with Amm Ammarin
 Poochai Huajai Mai Pae (ผู้ชายหัวใจไม่แพ้) (CH5,1998) with Mos Patiparn Pataweekarn
 Dod Diew Mai Diew Dai (โดดเดี่ยวไม่เดียวดาย) (CH5,1999) with Fluke Kerkpol
 Game Ruk Payabaht (เกมรักพยาบาท) (CH5,1999) with Captain Phutanate
 Rak Nai Saimauk (รักในสายหมอก) (CH3,1999) with Charlet
 Pantai Norasingh (พันท้ายนรสิงห์) (CH3,2000) with Tui Teerapat
 Keb Pandin (เก็บแผ่นดิน) (CH7,2001) with Captain Phutanate
 Ruk Kerd Nai Thaladsod (รักเกิดในตลาดสด) (CH7,2001) with Andrew Gregson
 Hongfah and Somwang (หงส์ฟ้ากับสมหวัง) (CH7,2001) with Gott Jakkrapun
 Fah Pieng Din (ฟ้าเพียงดิน) (CH3,2001) with Captain Phutanate
 Roy Leh Saneh Rai (ร้อยเล่ห์เสน่ห์ร้าย) (CH5,2002) with Tik Jesdaporn Pholdee
 Mueng Dala (เมืองดาหลา) (CH7,2002) with Captain Phutanate
 Bang Ruk Soi 9 (บางรักซอย 9) (CH9) sitcom with Tang Saksit [active, since 2003]
 Lued Kattiya [The Princess] (CH5,2003) (เลือดขัตติยา) with Tik Jesdaporn Pholdee
 Glub Ban Rao Na...Ruk Ror Yoo (กลับบ้านเรานะ...รักรออยู่) (CH7,2004) with Brook Danuporn
 Kaew Luem Kon (แก้วลืมคอน) (CH5,2005) with Captain Phutanate
 Song Rao Nirundorn (สองเรานิรันดร) (CH3,2005) with Ken Teeradeth Wongpuapun
 Huajai Chocolate (หัวใจช็อกโกแลต) (CH5,2005) with Mos Patiparn Pataweekarn
 Sanya Kaen Saen Ruk (สัญญาแค้นแสนรัก) (CH7,2006) with Por Nattawut
 Ruk Tur Took Wun [Love you Everyday] (รักเธอทุกวัน) (CH3,2007) with Ken Teeradeth Wongpuapun
 Laong Dao (Stardust) (ละอองดาว) (CH5,2007) with Kong Saharat
 Bang Ruk Soi 9 On Stage (กอนจะถึง บางรักซอย 9) (2008) Live Performances at Ratchadalai Theater, Esplande
 Artit Ching Duang (อาทิตย์ชิงดวง)(CH5,2009) with Nat Thephussadin Na Ayutthaya
 Proong Nee Gor Ruk Ter (พรุ่งนี้ก็รักเธอ) (CH5, 2009) with Pong Nawat Kulrattanarak
 Malai Sarm Chai (มาลัยสามชาย) (CH5, 2010) with Captain Phutanate, Saharat Sangkapreecha and Yook Songpaisarn
 Moo Daeng (หมูแดง) (CH3, 2012) (Invited actor)
 Khu Kam (คู่กรรม) (CH5, 2013) (Invited actor)
 Phap Arthan (ภาพอาถรรพ์) (CH5, 2013) with  Pong Nawat Kulrattanarak
 Ngao Jai (เงาใจ) (CH.ONE, 2015) (Invited actor)
 ฺBan Lang Mek (บัลลังก์เมฆ) (CH.ONE, 2015) with Sornram Theppitak, Patiparn Pataweekarn and Somchai Khemklad
 Kaen Ruk Salub Chata (แค้นรักสลับชะตา) (CH3,2021) (Invited actor)

Variety Show Host
 Wan Warn Yang Wharn Yoo (วันวานยังหวานอยู่) with Gik Giert Gritjaruen(CH7)
 E(ntertainment) mouth (E-mouth) [Music program] with Na Nek (Ketsetsawat Palakawong Na Ayutthaya)(CH7)
 Game Wat Duang (เกมวัดดวง) with Na Nek (Ketsetsawat Palakawong Na Ayutthaya)(CH5)
 I Love the Night Life with Puri Hiranpruk(CH3)
 Trendy-D with Fluke Kerkpol(CH5)
 Club 5 Report(CH5)
 JeabAom (CH3)

Awards

2002
Mekhalar Award - Best Leading Actress(Roy Leh Saneh Rai)
Top Award - Best Leading Actress(Roy Leh Saneh Rai)
The Good Child of the Year Award

2004
Mekhalar Award - Best Comedic Actress(Bangruk Soi 9)
Golden Award - Best Host(Wan Warn Yang Wharn Yoo)
Hamburger Award- Best Actress

2005
Tape Tong Award - Best Host(Wan Warn Yang Wharn Yoo)
IN magazine Award - Best love couple in drama(Song Rao Nirundorn)

2006
Asian Television Award 2006 - Best Leading Actress(Hua Jai Chocolate)
TV Gossip Award - Best Host(WanWaanYungWaanYoo)
Young & Smart Award - Best Actress

2007
IN magazine Award-Best love couple in drama(Ruk Tur Took Wun)
Seventeen Star Icon
OK! Magazine Award -Female Hot Stuff

References 

1975 births
Living people
Phiyada Jutharattanakul
Phiyada Jutharattanakul
Phiyada Jutharattanakul
Phiyada Jutharattanakul
Phiyada Jutharattanakul
Phiyada Jutharattanakul
Phiyada Jutharattanakul